Robert "Bob" Herbert Mize Jr. (4 February 1907 - 17 August 2000) was Bishop of Damaraland from 1960 to his expulsion in 1968. He was born on 4 February 1907 into an ecclesiastical family in Emporia, Kansas. His father Robert Herbert Mize Sr. was Missionary Bishop of Salina from 1921 to 1938. He was educated at the University of Kansas. After his ordination in 1932 he worked with disadvantaged boys at a mission in western Kansas.

In 1945, he founded the St. Francis Boys Home at Ellsworth in the centre of the state, a position he held until his elevation to the episcopate. A supporter of the Confraternity of the Blessed Sacrament in the United States, he died on 17 August 2000 and is buried in Ellis County, Kansas.

References

External links

1907 births
American educational theorists
People from Emporia, Kansas
University of Kansas alumni
20th-century Anglican Church of Southern Africa bishops
Anglican bishops of Damaraland
2000 deaths
People from Ellsworth, Kansas
Scientists from Kansas